Imam Al-Mutawakkil Ali al-Mutahhar was a ruler of Yemen from Sana’a who reigned from 1436 to 1474. He belonged to the Qasimid family who were descendants of the Prophet Muhammad, He ruled in the way of the Quran and the Sunnah and he left a number of writings on Hadith including praise poetry for the Islamic prophet Mohammad.

Rivalry for the imamate

Al-Mutahhar bin Muhammad was no immediate relative of the family that had provided imams for the last three generations. He was a descendant of the grand organizer of Zaydiyyah Islam, al-Qasim ar-Rassi (d. 860), in the 14th degree. When the old imam al-Mansur Ali died of the plague that ravaged Yemen in 1436, he was one of three candidates who brought forward their da'wa (call for the imamate). He took the honorific title al-Mutawakkil al-Mutahhar. The two other claimants were al-Mahdi Salah ad-Din (d. 1445) and al-Mansur an-Nasir (d. 1462). Of these, al-Mansur initially became the dominant, and imprisoned his two rivals. While al-Mahdi died in captivity, al-Mutawakkil was released by his captor after some time. In spite of the internal political disunity, the Zaidi community was relatively safe for incursions from the Sunni lowland of Yemen. The once powerful Rasulid Dynasty declined rapidly and collapsed altogether in 1442–1454. A new lowland power, the Tahiride Dynasty, took over in 1454. They did what they could to discomfort the Zaidi state from the beginning.

Territorial losses

After some skirmishing, the Tahiride Sultan Ali temporarily took Dhamar in 1460. In the following year, Ali managed to seize San'a with the help of a Zaidi rebel, expelling al-Mutawakkil from the city. A son of the imam was set up as fief-holder, exerting power together with the Tahiride governor al-Ba'dani. However, already in 1464 San'a was taken by strategy by the rival imam al-Mu’ayyad Muhammad who held the city until his demise in 1503. Al-Mutawakkil al-Mutahhar died in Dhamar in 1474, and his position was claimed by three would-be imams, further increasing the complicated political picture in the Zaidi lands. Al-Mutawakkil left a number of writings, including praise poems for the  Muhammad and answers to legal questions. His grandson Yahya bin al-Mukhtar bin al-Mutahhar was emir of Ta'izz under the Tahiride Sultan Amir.

See also

 Imams of Yemen
 Rassids

References

1398 births
1474 deaths
Zaydi imams of Yemen
15th century in Yemen
15th-century Arabs